Sandeep Singh Sidhu (born November 15, 1989), known as Sunny Malton, is a Punjabi Canadian rapper and singer. He rose to mainstream with his track 'Issa Jatt' with Sidhu Moose Wala. His song Levels with Sidhu charted at 32 on Canadian Hot 100.

He is the co-founder of Brown Boys and TPM Records and known as the right-hand man of rapper Sidhu Moose Wala.

Early life and education 
Sandeep was born on November 15, 1989 into a Canadian Punjabi Sikh family and grew up and attended secondary school in Malton, Toronto. He worked at Canadian Tire before the success of his music career.

Career

Early career 
In 2016, Malton released a freestyle diss track called 'Jus Remain Humble Doe' on the beat from Fire Squad by J Cole, towards Fateh, Jus Reign, Lilly Singh and Humble the Poet. One prominent line included "He fake with that beard, Rick Ross" directed at Fateh.

Rise to Fame 
In August 2017, Sidhu Moosewala and Byg Byrd released "So High" which became Moosewala's most successful track and the pinnacle of his musical career. Malton can be heard at the start of the song saying "Imma Imma Brown Boy" which became an iconic catchphrase. He can also been seen throughout the music video, which was shot in Toronto. Malton's first music collaboration with Sidhu, was the song "Issa Jatt" in October 2021.

In 2017, Malton featured on "Just Listen" by Sidhu Moosewala. The song managed to reach 12th in the UK Asian Charts. Other significant Malton collaborations and features included "Just Listen" (2018), "East Side Flow" (2019), "Sidhu's Anthem" (2019), "Chosen" (2019), "B-Town (2019) and "Never Fold" (2022).

Releases After the Death of Moosewala 
Malton's first release after Moosewala's death was on November 1, 2022, called "Letter to Sidhu".

In January 2023, Malton released "Signs", where he also paid tribute to his former friend, Sidhu Moosewala.

In February 2023, Malton took part in his first public interview since the death of Moosewala. Malton had stated "he sees Moosewala in his dreams" and it took him 9 months to get over his death.

Feuds

Sikander Kahlon 
In 2020, Sikander Kahlon dissed Malton on Twitter over his issue with Sidhu Moose Wala unfollowing him on Instagram. Sunny responded on Twitter with "The clowns don’t care about what’s right or wrong, all their hoping for is one song with Sidhu.. the shit you dreaming bout, we did in reality". This led to Kahlon releasing a diss track released called "Sunny Milton".

Sidhu Moosewala, Byg Byrd & Brown Boys 
The initial Brown Boys feud started between Moosewala and Sunny Malton, Byg Byrd and BigBoiDeep after their release of the album Brown Boys Forever. On Instagram, Byrd and Malton said Sidhu Moosewala was not paying them and was "leaking" their songs. Moosewala responded with "I am ready to swear on anything religious. Putting my hand on my heart I am ready to say that if I have ever leaked any song of mine, I want my tongue to be held and I will stop singing."

In December 2020 and January 2021, Sunny Malton and Byg Byrd also got into a serious internet feud over ownership of Brown Boys Records. Despite being equal partners, Malton claimed his personal relationship was suffering for the last 4–5 months and that BygByrd signed artist, Tarna without his permission under alias of Brown Boys.

Reconciliation with Sidhu Moosewala 
In October 2021, after resolving his previous feud with Sidhu Moosewala, Malton took to Instagram to say "In the end of all this nonsense, I learned that Sidhu is realer than BygPigeon. BygPigeon isn't a Byrd he's a BygSnake." He also posted a picture on Instagram with Sidhu Moosewala with the caption "We Back, Scary Hours... To all the fans, I ain't gonna say much other than Ik Vari Hor (One more time)".

Personal life 
In February 2019, Sunny Malton got engaged to his long-time girlfriend of 10 years, Parveen Chahal. They soon got married on April 25, 2020.  In January 2023, Malton and Parveen announced the arrival of their newborn baby daughter.

Discography

Extended plays

Singles discography

As lead artist

As featured artist

References 

1989 births
Living people
Rappers from Toronto
Canadian male rappers
Punjabi rappers